Moving to Mars, directed by Mat Whitecross, is a 2009 documentary following the story of two Burmese families from a refugee camp near the Thai/Burmese border moving to their new homes in the United Kingdom.

References

External links

2009 documentary films
2009 films
British documentary films
2000s Burmese-language films
Documentary films about refugees
Films directed by Mat Whitecross
2000s English-language films
2009 multilingual films
British multilingual films
2000s British films